Stereochilus is a genus of orchids native to the Himalayas, Indochina and the Philippines.

Species accepted as of June 2014:

Stereochilus brevirachis Christenson - Vietnam, Yunnan
Stereochilus dalatensis (Guillaumin) Garay - Vietnam, Yunnan, Thailand
Stereochilus erinaceus (Rchb.f.) Garay - Vietnam, Peninsular Malaysia, Thailand
Stereochilus hirtus Lindl. - Sikkim, Bhutan, Assam, Myanmar
Stereochilus laxus (Rchb.f.) Garay - Myanmar
Stereochilus pachyphyllus (Cavestro) Cavestro - Thailand
Stereochilus ringens (Rchb.f.) Garay - Assam, Philippines

References

External links 
 
 

Vandeae genera
Orchids of Asia
Aeridinae